Pier Giacomo Pisoni (8 July 1928 – 8 February 1991) was an Italian historian, paleographer and archivist.

Born in Germignaga near Luino, Italy, he specially devoted his work to Middle Ages and modern local history of Lago Maggiore. He rediscovered and published the 14th century comment, which was given up for lost, on Dante's "Inferno" from the "Divina Commedia", written by Guglielmo Maramauro, Petrarca's friend ("Expositione sopra l'Inferno di Dante Alligieri"). Archivist of the Princes Borromeo, he transcribed and published several local epigraphs, documents, manuscripts, communal statutes, letters, ancient account books (as the "Liber tabuli Vitaliani Bonromei"). He collected ancient popular tales, he published articles and books about Lombard history, monographies on artistic monuments or historical families, like the thrilling and curious story of brothers Mazzardi ("I fratelli della Malpaga"), five pirates who in early 15th century settled in the castles of Cannero and terrorized the whole Lago Maggiore.

External links
The complete biography and bibliography
About the square dedicated to him

1928 births
1991 deaths
20th-century Italian historians
Italian archivists
20th-century Italian male writers
Italian male non-fiction writers